Aashik Awara is a 1993 Bollywood romantic drama film directed by Umesh Mehra. It stars débutante actors Saif Ali Khan and Mamta Kulkarni in pivotal roles. The film brought Khan and Kulkarni the Filmfare Award for best Filmfare Award for Best Male Debut and Filmfare Award for Lux New Face of the Year, respectively.

Plot
At the hands of bandits, a young taxi driver and his wife, a music teacher, are dying. Their son, Jai (Saif Ali Khan), after contacting the scammers, lives clumsily due to deception. But trying to raid a cargo of gold belonging to a large smuggler, Jai is forced to flee from the police and from the bandits. Hiding, he gets into the house of a man, rescuing his father. Taking advantage of the opportunity, Jai impersonates a fiancé of the daughter of the owner of the house who came from the USA...

Cast

 Saif Ali Khan as Jaidev "Jai" Singh/Jimmy/Rakesh Rajpal
 Mamta Kulkarni as Jyoti
 Mohnish Bahl as Vikram Mehra
 Navin Nischol as Dilip Singh, taxi driver (in a cameo).
 Sharmila Tagore as Mrs. Singh, Dilip's wife (in a cameo).
 Saeed Jaffrey as Kedarnath Tripathi, grandfather of Jyoti
 Pankaj Dheer as Ranvir Tripathi, father of Jyoti
 Rita Bhaduri as Gayatri Deshmukh Tripathi, mother ofJyoti
 Kader Khan as Jaggu, father of Tunnu
 Rakesh Bedi as Tunnu, son of Jaggu
 Sharat Saxena as Garga
 Satish Shah as  Police Inspector Jagannath
 Amritpal as Deva Singh 
 Archana Puran Singh as Sheela, mother of Vikram and wife of Deva Singh
 Ghanashyam Nayak as Police Constable, under Police Inspector Jagannath
 Viju Khote as  Kasturi, Garga's right-hand man
 Malay Chakrabarty as Kasturi Lal, Sheela's brother
 Guddi Maruti as Batwoman in club
 Ravi Patwardhan as Judge at Court
 Vivek Vaswani as Real Rakesh Rajpal 
 Amarnath Mukherjee as Minister Deshmukh
 Suhas Khandke as Defence lawyer of Ranvir

Awards 

 39th Filmfare Awards:

Won

 Best Male Debut – Saif Ali Khan
 Best Female Debut – Mamta Kulkarni

Soundtrack
Lyrics : Anand Bakshi

References

External links 
 

1993 films
1990s Hindi-language films
Films scored by Laxmikant–Pyarelal
Films directed by Umesh Mehra
Hindi-language romance films